The year 1961 in radio involved some significant events.

Events
March 7 – Los Angeles station KLAC begins FM broadcasting as KLAC-FM.
April 1 – The Zenith Radio FM Stereo standard is authorized for US FM stations by the FCC.
April 12: 07:00 UTC – Soviet announcer Yuri Levitan broadcasts news of Yuri Gagarin's Vostok 1 mission, the first human spaceflight, on Radio Moscow while it is still in progress.
October 8 – The BBC Home Service in the United Kingdom first broadcasts In Touch; the world's first national radio programme for people who are blind; it will still be running in 2021.

Debuts
February 11 – KSHE debuts as a female-oriented rock station in St. Louis, Missouri.
April 12 – WLKW/990-Providence, Rhode Island signs on as Rhode Island's only 50 kW A.M. station.
June 25 – WPLM-FM/99.1-Plymouth, Massachusetts signs on.
KHAK-AM and KHAK-FM, Cedar Rapids, Iowa, sign on at 1360 AM and 98.1 FM, respectively. Although formatting country music, neither station is exclusively country until some point later in 1960s.
WIBC-FM in Indianapolis, Indiana signs on the air.
WNOR, an Active Rock station in the Hampton Roads area of the United States, has its debut.
WKFD/1370-Wickford, Rhode Island begins broadcasting.
Lohman and Barkley, a radio talk show featuring Al Lohman and Roger Barkley, begins on KLAC in Los Angeles and runs on several stations until 1986.
October 23  – WAMU is established as a FM station and part of the Educational Radio Network, in Washington, D.C.

Births
 February 25 – Todd Blackledge, American sports radio host, previously NFL player
 March 4 – Tom Churchill, Iowa-based radio and television weatherman, inventor of the Digital Weatherman, a computer automation system
 March 14 – Gary Dell'Abate, American radio producer (The Howard Stern Show)
 April 26 – Anthony Cumia, American radio personality (The Anthony Cumia Show, previously of The Opie and Anthony Show)
 September 29 – Stephanie Miller, American comedian and radio talk show host (The Stephanie Miller Show)
 October 25 – Pat Sharp, English radio DJ and children's television host
 December 30 – Sean Hannity, American talk radio host and conservative commentator

Deaths
 April 21 – Wallace Greenslade, English radio announcer (born 1912)
 October 22 – L. Stanton Jefferies, English musician and radio producer (born 1896)

References

 
Radio by year